Bel Air is the fourth studio album by the German alternative rock band Guano Apes, and the first released after the band's reunion in 2009. It was released on 1 April 2011 on Columbia Europe, eight years after their previous album Walking on a Thin Line.

Background
The album marked a notable change in style for Guano Apes, as it shows the band leaving their alternative rock roots behind and incorporating elements of dance and pop music in their songs, with synthesizers and electronic drum loops fulfilling prominent roles in multiple songs.

Bel Air entered the German album charts at No. 1. Single "Oh What a Night" reached No. 37 on the German charts.

The album is available in four different editions: a standard edition (one disc), deluxe edition (one disc and poster), gold edition (two discs), and a vinyl edition (two records and poster).

Music videos
Four music videos were filmed for songs off of Bel Air: "Oh What a Night", "Sunday Lover", "This Time" and "When the Ships Arrive".

Track listing

Personnel
Mastered by – Kai Blankenberg
Mixed by – Arne Neurand (tracks: 5, 6, 8, 10 to 14), Randy Staub (tracks: 2), Terry Date (tracks: 7), Tom Lord-Alge (tracks: 1, 3, 4, 9)
Produced by – Guano Apes, Jon Schumann

Charts

Weekly charts

Year-end charts

References

External links

2011 albums
Guano Apes albums
Columbia Records albums